Connor James is the name of:

Connor Jones (baseball) (born 1994), American baseball player
Connor Jones (footballer) (born 1998), English footballer
Connor Jones (ice hockey) (born 1990), Canadian ice hockey player